Group 1 consisted of four of the 32 teams entered into the European zone: Cyprus, Denmark, Poland, and Portugal. These four teams competed on a home-and-away basis for one of the 8.5 spots in the final tournament allocated to the European zone. The spot would be assigned to the group's winner.

Standings

Matches

Notes

External links 
Group 1 Detailed Results at RSSSF

1
1976–77 in Cypriot football
1977–78 in Cypriot football
1976 in Danish football
1977 in Danish football
1976–77 in Polish football
1977–78 in Polish football
1976–77 in Portuguese football
1977–78 in Portuguese football